Marjan Petković (born 22 May 1979 in Brackenheim) is a German football player of Serbian descent. He is currently a free agent, having lastly played six years for Eintracht Braunschweig until 2015.

Career
He made his debut on the professional league level in the 2. Bundesliga with FSV Frankfurt on 1 March 2009 when he came on as a substitute in the 65th minute after the main goalkeeper Patric Klandt was sent off for a professional foul. Petković left FSV Frankfurt after one season to join Eintracht Braunschweig in the 3. Liga. In 2010–11, he was Braunschweig's starting goalkeeper when the club won promotion back into the 2. Bundesliga. Because of an injury, Petković lost his starting spot to Daniel Davari early in the 2011–12 2. Bundesliga season. During the 2012–13 2. Bundesliga season, he made four league appearances throughout the campaign when Braunschweig won promotion to the Bundesliga. On the first matchday of the 2013–14 Bundesliga season, Petković then made his debut in the first tier, getting the start over Davari in Braunschweig's opening game against SV Werder Bremen. In 2015, after six years with Eintracht Braunschweig, he left the club after his contract had expired.

References

External links
 

1979 births
Living people
People from Brackenheim
Sportspeople from Stuttgart (region)
Footballers from Baden-Württemberg
German footballers
TSG 1899 Hoffenheim players
TSG 1899 Hoffenheim II players
SV Sandhausen players
FSV Frankfurt players
Eintracht Braunschweig players
Eintracht Braunschweig II players
Bundesliga players
2. Bundesliga players
3. Liga players
Association football goalkeepers
German people of Serbian descent